Gurazada (or Gurajada) is a village in Krishna district of the Indian state of Andhra Pradesh.  It is located in Pamidimukkala mandal of Nuzvid revenue division. It is famous for the ancestors of the poet Gurazada Apparao

References

Villages in Krishna district